Mór Muman is a Gaelic-Irish female given name.

Notable people with the name
 Mór Muman (died 630s), Queen of Munster
 Mór Muman (died 742)
 Mór Muman Ní Briain (died 1218), Queen of Connacht
 Mór Muman Bean a' Burc (died 1421)
 Mhóire Muman (died 1527)

External links
 Index of Names in Irish Annals: Mór Muman / Mór Mhumhan

Irish-language feminine given names